Chaos;Head is a 12-episode Japanese anime television series based on the video game of the same name, which was developed by 5pb. and Nitroplus. The series was directed by Takaaki Ishiyama at the animation studio Madhouse, with character design by Shuichi Shimamura and script supervision by Toshiki Inoue. Takeshi Abo, the composer for the Chaos;Head video game, was credited for the anime's soundtrack, but did not have a large role in the anime's production. The opening theme is "F.D.D." by Kanako Itō and the ending theme is "Super Special" by Seira Kagami.

The series was announced in July 2008 through the magazines Dengeki Daioh and Monthly Comic Alive, and premiered on Japanese television on October 15, 2008, airing weekly for twelve episodes until the series finale on December 31, 2008, on Chiba TV, TV Saitama, TVK, Tokyo MX, and Kids Station. It was released by VAP in DVD volumes in Japan, starting on March 4, 2009; the first DVD volume was the fourteenth best selling animation DVD in Japan during its release week. Funimation acquired the license for the North American rights for the series in 2010, and released it on DVD and Blu-ray on November 29, 2011, in both a limited edition and a regular release; a budget-priced re-release followed on January 13, 2015. Madman Entertainment acquired the license for the Australian rights in 2011, and released it on DVD and Blu-ray on February 15, 2012. Manga Entertainment licensed the series for the United Kingdom, and released it on DVD on October 22, 2012.


Episodes

References

External links
  

Lists of anime episodes
Science Adventure